In enzymology, a caffeoyl-CoA O-methyltransferase is an enzyme that catalyzes the chemical reaction

S-adenosyl-L-methionine + caffeoyl-CoA  S-adenosyl-L-homocysteine + feruloyl-CoA

Thus, the two substrates of this enzyme are S-adenosyl methionine and caffeoyl-CoA, whereas its two products are S-adenosylhomocysteine and feruloyl-CoA. A large number of natural products are generated via a step involving this enzyme.

This enzyme is classified to the family of transferases, specifically those transferring one-carbon group methyltransferases. The systematic name of this enzyme class is S-adenosyl-L-methionine:caffeoyl-CoA 3-O-methyltransferase. Other names in common use include caffeoyl coenzyme A methyltransferase, caffeoyl-CoA 3-O-methyltransferase, and trans-caffeoyl-CoA 3-O-methyltransferase. This enzyme participates in phenylpropanoid biosynthesis.

Structural studies

References

EC 2.1.1
Enzymes of known structure
O-methylated hydroxycinnamic acids metabolism
O-methylation